Homaloxestis xylotripta is a moth in the family Lecithoceridae. It was described by Edward Meyrick in 1918. It is found in north-western India and northern Vietnam.

The wingspan is 15–16 mm. The forewings are light fuscous and the hindwings are light greyish.

References

Moths described in 1918
Homaloxestis